The Men's ski big air competition at the FIS Freestyle Ski and Snowboarding World Championships 2021 was held on 16 March. A qualification was held on 15 March 2021.

Qualification
The qualification was started on 15 March at 09:40. The six best skiers from each heat qualified for the final.

Heat 1

Heat 2

Final
The final was started on 16 March at 10:00.

References

Men's ski big air